Killer tomato may refer to:
 a monster from a comedy movie franchise, see Attack of the Killer Tomatoes (disambiguation)
 Debi Pelletier, American professional wrestler, better known by her ring name The Killer Tomato
 in naval jargon, an inflatable seaborne target for gunnery practice, named after the monster